This article is a list of Comedy Central Presents episodes.

Series overview

Episodes

Season 1 (1998–99)

Season 2 (1999)

Season 3 (2000)

Season 4 (2000–01)

Season 5 (2001)

Season 6 (2002)

Season 7 (2003)

Season 8 (2004)

Season 9 (2004–05)

Season 10 (2006)

Season 11 (2007)

Season 12 (2008)

Season 13 (2009)

Season 14 (2010)

Season 15 (2011)

External links
comedycentral.com (official episode list)
 

Comedy Central Presents